Lethebrook is a coastal rural locality in the Whitsunday Region, Queensland, Australia. In the  Lethebrook had a population of 51 people.

History 
Banana Pocket Provisional School opened on 25 May 1922. In 1926 it became Banana Pocket State School. In 1949 it was renamed Lethebrook State School. It closed on 15 June 1964.

In the  Lethebrook had a population of 51 people.

References 

Whitsunday Region
Coastline of Queensland
Localities in Queensland